Agomani Higher Secondary School is a government-aided secondary school in Agomani, Dhubri District, Assam. It was founded in 1948 and upgraded to "higher secondary school" in 1977.

References

High schools and secondary schools in Assam
Educational institutions established in 1948
1948 establishments in India